Holliston may refer to:
Holliston, Saskatoon, Canada
Holliston, Massachusetts, USA
Holliston High School, a secondary school in Holliston, Massachusetts
Holliston (TV series), a television show on Fearnet, set in Holliston, Massachusetts

People with the given name
Holliston Coleman, American actress